Sanrafaelia is a monotypic genus of flowering plants belonging to the family Annonaceae. The only species is Sanrafaelia ruffonammari.

Its native range is Tanzania.

References

Annonaceae
Annonaceae genera
Monotypic magnoliid genera